The men's super heavyweight boxing +91 kg boxing event at the 2015 European Games in Baku was held from 18 to 26 June at the Baku Crystal Hall.

Results

Final

Top half

Bottom half

References

External links

Men 91+